The Northern Cheyenne Exodus, also known as Dull Knife's Raid, the Cheyenne War, or the Cheyenne Campaign, was the attempt of the Northern Cheyenne to return to the north, after being placed on the Southern Cheyenne reservation in the Indian Territory, and the United States Army operations to stop them. The period lasted from 1878 to 1879.

Background
Following the Battle of the Little Bighorn attempts by the U.S. Army to subdue the Northern Cheyenne intensified. In 1877, after the Dull Knife Fight, when Crazy Horse surrendered at Fort Robinson a few Cheyenne chiefs and their people surrendered as well. The Cheyenne chiefs that surrendered at the fort were Dull Knife, Little Wolf, Standing Elk, and Wild Hog with nearly one thousand Cheyenne. On the other hand, Two Moon surrendered at Fort Keogh with three hundred Cheyenne in 1877. The Cheyenne wanted and expected to live on the reservation with the Sioux in accordance with an April 29, 1868 treaty of Fort Laramie of which both Dull Knife and Little Wolf had signed. However, shortly after arriving at Fort Robinson it was recommended that the Northern Cheyenne be moved to the reservation at Fort Reno with the Southern Cheyenne.

Confinement in the South
Following confirmation from Washington the Cheyenne started their move with 972 people; upon reaching the Cheyenne-Arapaho reservation on August 5, 1877 there were only 937. Some elderly had perished along the way and some young men crept away and headed back north. After reaching the reservation, the Northern Cheyenne noticed how poverty-stricken it was, and began to fall sick in the late summer of 1877. When conditions did not improve after a federal investigation into reservation conditions, the Cheyenne were given authorization to hunt.  

When the Cheyenne attempted to find game to hunt none was found, just a wasteland of dead buffalo remains (The U.S. Army sanctioned and actively endorsed the wholesale slaughter of bison herds. The federal government promoted bison hunting for various reasons, to allow ranchers to range their cattle without competition from other bovines, and primarily to weaken the North American Indian population by removing their main food source and to pressure them onto the Indian reservations during times of conflict. ); this was the winter of 1877–78. Unfortunately in 1878 there was a measles outbreak that struck the Northern Cheyenne, and in August 1878 the Cheyenne chiefs began the organization to move north. On September 9, 1878 Little Wolf, Dull Knife, Wild Hog, and Left Hand told their people to organize to leave. Leaving were 297 (the number could be as high as 353) men, women, and children.

Escape to the North
In the early morning of September 10 the band fled up the North Canadian River. By 3 AM the alarm was sounded that the Cheyenne were gone. Passing the present sites of Watonga, Oklahoma and Canton, Oklahoma they crossed north over the watershed into the Cimarron Basin, crossing the Cimarron River the evening of September 10. There, near the present site of Freedom, Oklahoma they rested then trailed 11 miles up Turkey Creek to Turkey Springs. After a few hours rest there Dull Knife and a few others led the women and children on to St. Jacob's Well and The Big Basin in what is now Clark County, Kansas where they camped.

Fight at Turkey Creek
The Cheyenne, anticipating pursuit, prepared an ambush at Turkey Springs. While one band prepared rifle pits at the springs, other bands fanned out over the country looking for supplies. In one case, attacking and killing two cowboys, they obtained two mules. In another, attacking some cowboys during breakfast, they obtained both some food and a Sharps carbine.

Battle of Punished Woman's Fork

After crossing the Arkansas River the Cheyenne were followed closely by a mixed command of 238 soldiers of the 19th Infantry and 4th Cavalry under Lieutenant Colonel William H. Lewis of the 19th Infantry. On September 27, the Cheyenne prepared an ambush in a canyon on Punished Woman's Fork (north of present-day Scott City, Kansas), but it was aborted due to an over-eager brave who fired on the scouts before the ambush was sprung.

In the Battle of Punished Woman's Fork, Lewis deployed a company of infantry to block the entrance to the canyon and attacked late in the afternoon along the rim of the canyon with four troops of dismounted cavalry, advancing by bounds, pinning the Cheyenne including their families in the closed end below. However, Lewis was unaware of the Cheyenne's marksmanship and was shot in the leg, severing his femoral artery. This left a vacuum in Cavalry Regiment's leadership which the Cheyenne were able to exploit, escaping after dark. Lewis bled to death the next day and several other soldiers were wounded. However, the Cheyenne lost 60 horses, much baggage, and all of their food when part of the pony herd was discovered by the troopers.

Depredations in Kansas
A party of drovers encountered Cheyenne camped on Prairie Dog Creek, in northwestern Kansas on September 29 and lost 80 cattle. Between September 30 and October 3, 1878, in northwestern Kansas in present-day Decatur County, Kansas and Rawlins County, Kansas near Oberlin, Kansas, then a tiny hamlet, small parties of Cheyenne foraging for horses, cattle, and supplies fell on isolated settlers who had recently homesteaded along Sappa and Beaver Creeks, some of whom, recent immigrants from eastern Europe, had never seen an Indian.

Men and boys were killed; women and older girls raped. Often the settlers were approached in a friendly manner, then shot point blank. About 41 white men and boys were killed and, as per the Kansas senate, 25 white women and girls raped, the latter number seeming inflated given existing evidence.

Some observers link the actions of the Cheyenne with the Battle of Cheyenne Hole, an action in the spring of 1875 in the same area when a small village of Cheyenne was surprised and destroyed by Army troops. Other observers stress that this version has no basis in Cheyenne accounts and trace the depredation back to the fact that the fleeing Cheyennes had lost most of their ponies and all of their food in the Battle of Punished Woman's Fork which created a crisis among the tribespeople. Also, elderly or injured Cheyennes who could no longer keep up with the pace of their fleeing people and remained behind were mercilessly shot or clubbed to death by white posses.

On to Nebraska
From Turkey Creek on it was a running battle across Kansas and Nebraska, and soldiers from all surrounding forts (Fort Wallace, Fort Hays, Fort Dodge, Fort Riley, and Fort Kearney) were in pursuit of the Cheyenne. About ten thousand soldiers and three thousand settlers chased the Cheyenne both day and night. During the last two weeks of September the army had caught up to the Cheyenne five times but the Cheyenne were able to evade the army by keeping to arduous grounds where it was challenging for the army to follow.

Division
In the fall of 1878 after six weeks of running the Cheyenne chiefs held council and it was discovered that 34 of the original 297 were missing, most had been killed but a few had decided to take other paths to the north. This is where the Cheyenne split into two groups. The ones that wished to stop running were going along with Dull Knife to Red Cloud Agency, Wild Hog and Left Hand also decided to follow Dull Knife. Little Wolf continued north intending to go to the Powder River country.

Dull Knife's band
On October 23, 1878, Dull Knife's band of Cheyenne, only two days from Fort Robinson, were surrounded by the Army. After hearing that Red Cloud and Spotted Tail had been relocated to Pine Ridge, Dull Knife decided, due to weather and his people's condition, to go to Fort Robinson. That night the Cheyenne took apart their best guns with the women hiding the barrels under their clothing, and attaching the smaller pieces to clothes and moccasins as ornaments.

On October 25, 1878, Dull Knife, Left Hand, Wild Hog and the rest of the Cheyenne finally reached Fort Robinson. The barracks that had been built to house 75 soldiers now held 150 Cheyenne.

In December, Red Cloud was brought to Fort Robinson for a council with Dull Knife and the other chiefs. Dull Knife agreed to fight no more if the great father in Washington would let his people live on Pine Ridge that now held Red Cloud and his tribe. However, on January 3, 1879, the Cheyenne were ordered to return south to the Southern Cheyenne reservation. When the Cheyenne refused, bars were put on windows and no rations were given, including wood for heat.

On January 9, 1879, Dull Knife still refused to return south. However, Wild Hog and Left Hand agreed to talk but said their people would not go. As a result, Wild Hog was held as a prisoner and shackled. At 9:45 that night the Cheyenne tried to make a daring escape using the dismantled guns they had hidden upon arriving at the fort. The Cheyenne were immediately followed and many were killed in the Fort Robinson massacre.

By morning 65 Cheyenne, 23 of them wounded, were returned to Fort Robinson as prisoners. Only 38 Cheyenne escaped and remained alive, 32 of whom were together moving north pursued by the Army. Six Cheyenne were hiding only a few miles from the fort among rocks and were found during the next few days. At the Hat Creek Bluffs, 32 Cheyenne led by Little Finger Nail were trapped, and after the final battle at the pit, only nine were left alive.

 In January 1879, Dull Knife reached Pine Ridge where Red Cloud was being held as a prisoner. After months of delay from Washington the prisoners from Fort Robinson were released and allowed to go to Fort Keogh where Little Wolf had ended up. However, seven of the escapees had to stand trial for the murders that had been committed in Kansas. Charges were dismissed against them after a trial in Kansas. In 1994, the remains of those killed were repatriated.

Little Wolf's band
After the council near the North Platte where the Northern Cheyenne split up, Little Wolf's band continued north to the Sand Hills of Nebraska where they wintered along Wild Chokecherry Creek where there was plentiful deer, antelope and cattle. They saw a few white men during the winter but were undisturbed. In early spring they moved north to the Powder River. There they were located by scouts attached to troops from Fort Keogh commanded by Lieutenant W. P. Clark, an army officer known as White Hat to the Cheyenne and who had been friendly with Little Wolf in the past. After negotiation with first the scouts, then later Lieutenant Clark, the band agreed to surrender and go with the troopers to Fort Keogh. There they were offered service in the army as scouts. After some discussion even Little Wolf agreed to become a scout, as did Red Armed Panther.

Northern Cheyenne Reservation
After some delay, the Northern Cheyenne Indian Reservation was established in southeastern Montana near the Black Hills, and they were never forced to return to the south.

Notes and references

Chapter 14, "Cheyenne Exodus", pages 331 to 359, Bury My Heart at Wounded Knee: An Indian History of the American West, Dee Brown, Henry Holt (1970, Owl paperback edition 1991), trade paperback, 488 pages, 
Chapter 29, "Little Wolf and Dull Knife, 1876-79", pages 398 to 413 and Chapter 30, "The Fort Robinson Outbreak", pages 414 to 427, The Fighting Cheyennes, George Bird Grinnell, University of Oklahoma Press (1956, Scribner's Sons 1915), hardcover, 454 pages
Maddux, Vernon R. (2003). In Dull Knife's Wake: The True Story of the Northern Cheyenne Exodus of 1878, Horse Creek Publications. 
Dennis Collins, The Indians' last fight or the Dull Knife raid, Press of the Appeal to Reason (1915), hardcover, 326 pages Read on line or Download
Holding Stone Hands: On the Trail of the Cheyenne Exodus, by Alan Boye, Bison Books (September 1, 2001), trade paperback: 347 pages,   Google Books
Tell Them We Are Going Home: The Odyssey of the Northern Cheyennes, by John H. Monnett, University of Oklahoma Press (December 2004), trade paperback, 255 pages  
Cheyenne Autumn, Mari Sandoz, Bison Books (February 1, 1992), trade paperback, 290 pages,  

1878 in the United States
1879 in the United States
Northern Cheyenne Tribe
Cheyenne
Native American history of Oklahoma
Native American history of Kansas
Native American history of Nebraska
Native American history of South Dakota
Native American history of Montana